The Red Bull Road Rage is an extreme downhill on-road bike competition. The competition was first held in 2005 as a pro-invite only event, but since 2008 Red Bull has opened it up to amateur and professional racers. Red Bull Road Rage has seen editions held once in each Italy, France, Germany, Belgium, Latvia, Israel, Poland and Bosnia & Herzegovina and twice in Switzerland and the USA.

The event is similar to Four-cross mountain biking. An initial individual time trial ITT qualifying and seeding run is held, followed by the top 32 competitors racing four at a time in knock-out heats, with the two fastest progressing to the next round.

History 
The roots of Red Bull Road Rage can be traced back to Jon Mesko of Giant Bicycles, who came up with the idea in 2001. He contacted the Red Bull (North America) Communications Manager, Paul Melina, in 2004 to pitch the idea and in January 2005, Red Bull gave the green light to commence organising the event.

2005

Tuna Canyon, Malibu, California, USA 
The original Red Bull Road Rage was held down Tuna Canyon, Malibu in California, USA on 5 and 6 November 2005. The event was held on a 4.5 km course and included 49 bends with 390m elevation drop, giving an average gradient of 9.75% with a maximum of 18%.

Qualifying results

Final results 

*Run only timed for first rider across the line. **No average speed can be calculated for these riders due to run only being timed for first placed rider.

2006

Tuna Canyon, Malibu, California, USA 
In 2006 the event was set to return to Tuna Canyon, Malibu, California, scheduled for 11 November. 25 of the world's top professional racers from road and mountain biking were on the official start list. On 31 October following evaluation of the then fire danger conditions, the decision was made to cancel the event due to fire safety concerns from the Malibu City fire chief.

2007 
No Red Bull Road Rage was held in 2007.

2008

Gurnigelpass, Switzerland 
In 2008 Red Bull Road Rage was held again, this time for the first time in Europe. It was also the first time the event was opened up to amateur and professional riders. The event was held on a 3.8 km course with 340m elevation drop, descending the Gurnigelpass in Switzerland. Average gradient was 8.95% with a maximum of 18%.

Qualifying results

Final results 

*Run not timed. **No average speed can be calculated due to run not being timed.

2009
For the first time, 2009 saw multiple events held across Europe, with a total of four races. Three new venues were added including Italy, France and Germany and the season finale saw a return to racing in Switzerland.

Cortina d’Ampezzo, Italy 
The 2009 Red Bull Road Rage season opener was held for the first time in Italy, on 21 and 22 June 2009. The event was held on a 5 km course with 360m elevation drop, descending into Cortina d’Ampezzo in the Dolomites. Average gradient was 7.4% with a maximum of 12%.

Qualifying results

Final results 

*Run not timed. **No average speed can be calculated due to run not being timed.

Saint-Lary-Soulan, France 
The second Red Bull Road Rage of the season was held for the first time in France, on 13 September 2009. The event was held on a 4.6 km course with 350m elevation drop, descending from Saint-Lary-Soulan in the Pyrenees. Average gradient was 7.6% with a maximum of 12%.

Qualifying results

Final results

Moritzberg, Germany 
The third Red Bull Road Rage of the season was held for the first time in Germany, on 10 October 2009. The event was held on a 2.1 km course with 188m elevation drop, descending the Moritzberg, near Nuremberg. Average gradient was 8.95% with a maximum of 18%.

Qualifying results – Women

Final results – Women 

*Run not timed. **No average speed can be calculated due to run not being timed.

Qualifying results – Men

Final results – Men 

*Run not timed. **No average speed can be calculated due to run not being timed.

Full table of results

Rengg, Switzerland 
The 2009 Red Bull Road Rage season finale saw a return to racing in Switzerland, this time in Rengg, on 28 October 2009. The event was held on a 2.1 km course with 210m elevation drop, descending from Rengg into Entlebuch, Switzerland. Average gradient was 10% with a maximum of 16%.

Qualifying results

Final results 

*Run not timed. **No average speed can be calculated due to run not being timed.

2010

La Redoute, Aywaille, Belgium 
The 2010 Red Bull Road Rage season opener was held for the first time in Belgium, 22 May 2010. The event was held on a 950m course with 95m elevation drop, descending La Redoute into Aywaille. Average gradient was 10% with a maximum of 22%.

Qualifying results

Final results

Sigulda, Latvia 
The second 2010 Red Bull Road Rage event was held for the first time in Latvia, on 30 May 2010. The event was held on a 700m course with 80m elevation drop, descending along the National Bobsleigh Track access road in Sigulda, Latvia. Average gradient was 11.4% with a maximum of 15%.

Qualifying results – Women

Final results – Women

Qualifying results – Men

Final results – Men

Hamat Gader, Israel 
The 2010 Red Bull Road Rage season finale took place in yet another new venue, this time in Israel, 4 June 2010. The event was held on 3.3 km course with 295m elevation drop, descending from Mevo Hama to Hamat Gader, Israel. Average gradient was 8.94% with a maximum of 18%.

Qualifying results

Final results 

*Run not timed. **No average speed can be calculated due to run not being timed.

2011

Międzybrodzie Żywiecki, Poland 
The only 2011 Red Bull Road Rage event was held for the first time in Poland, 1 October 2011. The event was held on a 4 km course with 260m elevation drop, descending Góra Żar to Międzybrodzie Żywiecki. Average gradient was 6.5% with a maximum of 14%.

Qualifying results

Final results 

*Run not timed. **No average speed can be calculated due to run not being timed.

2012 

No Red Bull Road Rage was held in 2012.

2013

Mont Ventoux, France 
Mont Ventoux was set to stage a return to racing in France on 8 June 2013. The race was to be over a 6 km course with 445m elevation drop, both the longest and the most vertical drop to date, descending from the summit of Mont Ventoux (Mont Chauve) to Chalet Reynard on the eastern slope. Average gradient was at 7.1% with a maximum of 15%. On Thursday 30 May, the event was cancelled due to non-permission from the competent administrative authorities, due to adverse weather conditions forecast.

Sarajevo, Bosnia and Herzegovina 
The second scheduled Red Bull Road Rage race of 2013 became the season opener by default, on 6 July, after the event on Mont Ventoux was cancelled. The 3.5 km course with a total elevation drop of 280m was situated outside Sarajevo. Average gradient was at 8% with a maximum gradient of 12%.

Qualifying results 
Qualify groups were drawn at random and knock-out rounds commenced immediately for the 44 riders, with the top two riders in each group qualifying automatically for the 1/8 final round. The remaining 10 places were drawn again at random from the third-place finishers, with all but one rider progressing to the 1/8 final round.

Final results 

*Run not timed. **No average speed can be calculated due to run not being timed.

Guanella Pass, Georgetown, Colorado, USA 

Guanella Pass, Georgetown, Colorado, USA hosted the second Red Bull Road Rage of the season on 5 October 2013, making it the first time the race has returned to the US since its inauguration. The 2.5 km course with a total elevation drop of 170m was situated on Guanella pass above Georgetown, CO. At 3020m altitude, it is the first race to commence from altitude above 3000m. Average gradient was at 6.7% with a maximum gradient of 12%.

Qualifying results 
Qualifying was held in a 4X format with a points system in operation, 22 for 1st, 16 for 2nd, 12 for 3rd and 9 for 4th. In the case of a tie on points after three rounds, in order to differentiate the riders' rankings, a coefficient based on the riders raced against and where they placed in the overall qualifying came into play.

Final results 

*Run not timed. **No average speed can be calculated due to run not being timed.

Rio de Janeiro, Brazil 

For the first time, a South American country was also to feature as a location, with an event planned in Rio de Janeiro, Brazil on 26 October 2013, but this was later cancelled.

2014 - Present 

No Red Bull Road Rage events have been held from 2014 onwards.

Statistics

Courses 
Race course distances and total elevation drop have varied from event to event. The original Red Bull Road Rage descending Tuna Canyon, Malibu, California, USA, was held on a 4.5 km course, with 390m elevation drop. The shortest course was in Sigulda, Latvia, measuring just 700m and including only 80m elevation drop. The longest course was in Cortina d’Ampezzo, Italy, with a total distance of 5 km and 360m elevation drop.

Longest course: 5 km (Cortina d’Ampezzo, Italy)*
Shortest course: 700m (Sigulda, Latvia)
Highest elevation start point: 3020m (Guanella Pass, Georgetown, Colorado, USA)
Lowest elevation start point: 100m (Sigulda, Latvia)
Highest elevation finishing point: 2850m (Guanella Pass, Georgetown, Colorado, USA)
Lowest elevation finishing point: -85m (Hamat Gader, Israel)
Most elevation drop: 390m (Tuna Canyon, Malibu, California, USA)*
Least elevation drop: 80m (Sigulda, Latvia)
Steepest maximum gradient: 22% (La Redoute, Aywaille, Belgium)
Steepest average gradient: 11.4% (Sigulda, Latvia)
Flattest average gradient: 6.5% (Międzybrodzie Żywiecki, Poland)

* The planned course for the later cancelled event on Mont Ventoux, France, would have been the longest distance with 6 km and the biggest elevation drop with 445m.

Fastest speeds
The fastest officially recorded top speed was by Mauro Bettin in 2009 during the Italian Road Rage in Cortina d’Ampezzo, at 98.5 km/h. The fastest speed in wet conditions was recorded by Janos Köhler in 2013 during the Bosnian Road Rage in Sarajevo, at 97.3 km/h.

The fastest average speed during a timed run is Janos Köhler's ITT qualifying run in 2009 during the Swiss Road Rage in Rengg, at 76.125 km/h. David Lacoste holds the record for the highest recorded average speed during normal racing, when in 2010 during the Belgian Road Rage he achieved an average speed of 72.271 km/h during his semi final run.

Riders 
The most participations have been by Janos Köhler with 8, who has contested five finals and achieved four podium finishes. Janos Köhler is also the only rider to win two overall titles and to qualify in 1st place twice achieving the latter in two consecutive races. Guillaume Gualandi holds the record for the most consecutive appearances in a final with three. Janos Köhler and Sebastian Körber hold the record for the most consecutive podium finishes with two each, the Irishman doing so on two occasions. Guillaume Gualandi and Janos Köhler are the only riders to be ranked #1 in the World Rankings more than once, the Frenchman doing so in consecutive years, thus also the only rider to successfully defend a #1 World Ranking. Seven riders have won both the qualifying run and the final at the same event: Miles Rockwell – Tuna Canyon, Malibu, California (2005); Frédéric Moncassin – Saint-Lary-Soulan, France (2009); Birgit Braumann and Thomas Schäfer – Moritzberg, Germany (2009); Janos Köhler – La Redoute, Aywaille, Belgium (2010); Ivita Krūmiņa – Sigulda, Latvia (2010); and David McCook - Guanella Pass, Georgetown, Colorado (2013). The most successful rider is Janos Köhler with two wins, twice 2nd and a 4th place. The oldest rider to win is David McCook, who was 44 years and 210 days old when he won in Guanella Pass, Georgetown, Colorado. The youngest winner was Thomas Schäfer who was 25 years and 132 days old when he won on the Moritzberg, Germany.

Finals appearances 
One rider has contested five finals:
  (Rengg, Switzerland 2009: 2nd; La Redoute, Aywaille, Belgium 2010: 1st; Hamat Gader, Israel 2010: 4th; Sarajevo, Bosnia and Herzegovina 2013: 1st; Guanella Pass, Georgetown, Colorado 2013: 2nd)
Two riders have contested 3 finals each:
  (Gurnigelpass, Switzerland 2008: 1st; Cortina d’Ampezzo, Italy 2009: 4th; Saint-Lary-Soulan, France 2009: 2nd)
  (Saint-Lary-Soulan, France 2009: 3rd; Rengg, Switzerland 2009: 4th; La Redoute, Aywaille, Belgium 2010: 3rd)

Event wins by nationality – Men

Event wins by nationality – Women

World rankings 
Although there is no recognised points system in place, as each race has been run as a stand-alone event, based on full season of race results, the following riders finished as the #1 World Ranked Red Bull Road Rage athletes.
 2005 - *
 2008 - *
 2009 - 
 2010 - 
 2011 - *
 2013 - 

*Full season comprising one single event only.

Notes

References

External links 
 Red Bull Road Rage - official website
 Red Bull Official Website - contains links to other similar competitions run by Red Bull

Mountain biking events
Road Rage